The list of naval ships of Germany includes all naval ships which have been in service of the German Navy or its predecessors.

Other lists include:
 List of ships of the Imperial German Navy
 List of Kriegsmarine ships
 List of German Federal Navy ships
 List of German Navy ships
 List of German Navy ship classes
 List of U-boats of Germany
 List of battleships of Germany

A
 Acheron: hulk, launched 1877
 Acheron: submarine tender, launched 1919
 Acheron: minesweeper, launched 1967
 Adam Kuckhoff:  torpedo boat
 Adam Kuckhoff:  torpedo boat
 Adeline Hugo Stinnes 3; seaplane tender
 Adjutant: tender, launched 1905
 : auxiliary mine-layer, launched 1937 
 : 880 ton  gunboat, launched 1883
 Adler: training vessel, launched 1908
 Adler: 
 : 12,000 ton  heavy cruiser, launched 1933
 : 14,000 ton  heavy cruiser, launched 1937
 : 12,000 ton  heavy cruiser, launched 1934
 Adolf Bestelmeyer: experimental craft, launched 1943
 : Fleet tender, launched 20 February 1939, commissioned 11 June 1940
 : 3,700 ton : launched 1895
 Ahrenshoop (GS08):  minesweeper
 : Type 1923 torpedo boat, launched 15 July 1926, commissioned 5 May 1927, beached 9 April 1940
 :  (Type 141) fast attack craft, commissioned 1959 to 1975
 :  (Type 143) fast attack craft, decommissioned
 Albatros:  submarine chaser
 : gunboat, launched 1871
 : 2,000 ton : launched 1907
 Albert Gast (734):  missile boat
 Albert Leo Schlageter: Sail training ship, launched 1937, became Portuguese training ship  in 1961
 Albin Köbis: training vessel, ex-Ernst Thälmann
 Albin Köbis (S-712):  missile boat
 Albin Köbis (571):  corvette
 Aldebaran: minesweeper, launched 1941
 Alders: tender, launched 1918
 : corvette, launched 1885
 Alfred Merz: buoy tender
 Algol: minesweeper, launched 1943
 Algol: minesweeper, launched 1963
 Alice Roosevelt: torpedo boat, launched 1886
 :  (Type 140) fast attack craft, commissioned 1960—1974
 :  (Type 148) fast attack craft, decommissioned
 : NATO research vessel under German flag, in service since 1988
 Alster: survey vessel, launched 1961
 :  (Type 423) fleet service, surveillance, and ELINT ship
 Altenburg (314):  minesweeper
 Altentreptow (GS04):  minesweeper
 Altmark (H11):  support ship
 : 3-masted sail corvette of the Prussian Navy
 : 2,700 ton  light cruiser
 Amazone: minesweeper, launched 1963
 Ammerland: submarine tender, launched 1921
 :  (Type 703) small coastal tanker
 Amrum:  tug
 Angeln: transport, launched 1954
 : 
 Anklam:  minesweeper
 Anklam (S426):  minesweeper
 :  landing craft
 Answald: seaplane tender
 Anton Saefkow (826):  torpedo boat
 Anton Saefkow (853):  torpedo boat
 : Type 1936 destroyer, launched 1938
 : frigate, launched 1858
 : corvette, launched 1885
 : 2,700 ton  light cruiser, launched 22 April 1902, commissioned 12 May 1903, recommissioned 27 May 1940 as a floating anti-aircraft battery, scrapped 1948
 : corvette, launched 1871
 : 2,700 ton  light cruiser, launched 1900
 Ariadne:  minesweeper
 Arkona: experimental craft, launched 1918
 Arkona: Sperling-class buoy tender
 Arkona (D113):  buoy tender
 Arkturus: minesweeper, launched 1943
 : Unique ironclad warship
 Artur Becker (828):  torpedo boat
 Artur Becker (816):  torpedo boat
 Arvid Harnack (821):  torpedo boat
 Arvid Harnack (813):  torpedo boat
 Atair: minesweeper, launched 1941
 Atair: minesweeper, launched 1961
 : 17,000 ton unique auxiliary merchant cruiser
 Atlantis:  minesweeper, launched 1961
 Aue:  minesweeper
 :  (Type 352) minesweeper
  (cruiser): 4,400 ton  light cruiser, launched 1909
 :  (Type 120) frigate, commissioned 1962 to 1988
 :  (Type 122) frigate
 :  corvette
 August Lüttgens (732):  missile boat
 Ayesha: schooner, launched 1907

B
 :  (Type 332) minehunter
 Bad Doberan (242):  submarine chaser 
 Bad Doberan (222):  corvette
 :  (Type 332) minehunter
 : 7,800 ton , la-unched 1880
 : 29,000 ton , launched 1915
 :  (Type 722) tug
 Bansin (G446):  minesweeper
 Bant: Experimental craft; Stollergrund-class
 Barbara, training vessel, launched 1915
 : converted ocean-liner, commissioned 1849
 :  (Type 520) utility landing craft, used as transport ships (decommissioned)
 : gunboat, launched 1862
 : armoured gunboat, launched 1878
 : 7,800 ton , launched 1878
 : 29,000 ton , launched 1915
 :  (Type 101A) destroyer, decommissioned
 :  (Type 123) frigate
 Belchen, supply vessel, launched 1932
 : 3,700 ton , launched 1890
 Beowulf, training vessel, launched 1916
 Bergen: Sicherungsboot; Todendorf-class
 Bergen: Habicht-class mine-warfare vessel
 Bergen (S425):  minesweeper
 Bergen (213):  corvette
 : 3,300 ton  light cruiser
 Berlin, auxiliary cruiser, launched 1908
 Berlin, Krake-class mine-warfare vessel, launched 1957
 Berlin — Hauptstadt der DDR (412):  coastal protection vessel, launched 1979
 :  (Type 702) replenishment and combat support ship^
 Bernau (343):  minesweeper
 , Type 1934A destroyer, launched 1936
 Bernhard Bästlein (827):  torpedo boat
 Bernhard Bästlein (836):  torpedo boat
 Bernhard von Tschirschky: Air control ship; Krischan-class
 : armoured gunboat, launched 1876
 Biene, escort vessel, launched 1941
 : 3,000 ton , launched 1877
 : 42,000 ton , launched 1939
 Bitterfeld (332):  minesweeper
 Blauort: harbour tug; Klasse 729
 : gunboat, launched 1862
 : aviso, launched 1882
 Blitz, remote controlled craft, launched 1910
 Blitz: buoy tender
 : 3,000 ton , launched 1877
 : 15,800 ton unique heavy cruiser, launched 1908
 : 14,000 ton  heavy cruiser, launched 1937
 Bochum, mine-layer, launched 1944
 Bodensee, tanker, launched 1955
 Boelke: air control ship; K-V-class
 Börde (H72):  support ship
 Boltenhagen (GS09):  minesweeper
 : gunboat, launched 1833
 :  (Type 702) replenishment and combat support ship (ordered)
 Borkum, tanker, launched 1939
 Borna:  minesweeper
 Bottrop, mine-layer, launched 1944
 : , commissioned 1984
 : 10,500 ton , launched 1891
 Brandenburg, mine warfare vessel, launched 1936
 Brandenburg:  minesweeper
 :  (Type 123) frigate
 Brandtaucher, experimental submarine
 :  (Type 520) utility landing craft, used as transport ships (decommissioned)
  (battleship): 13,000 ton , launched 1902
 :  (Type 120) frigate, commissioned 1964 to 1989
 :  (Type 130) corvette, launched 2006, commissioned 2008
 Breitgrund: experimental craft; Stollergrund-class
 Breitling (D26):  buoy tender
 : corvette, launched 1842
  (cruiser): 3,300 ton  light cruiser, launched 1903
 :  (Type 122) frigate (in commission 1982 to 2014)
 : armoured gunboat, launched 1884
  (cruiser): 4,400 ton  mine-laying cruiser, launched 1916
  (auxiliary): Auxiliary gunnery training ship, launched 1931, commissioned 14 July 1932, sunk 7 August 1941
 Bremse, training vessel, launched 1940
 :  light cruiser, launched 1911
 Brommy, auxiliary, launched 1916
 :  frigate, former Royal Navy , commissioned 1959 to 1965
 : armoured gunboat, launched 1884
  (cruiser): 4,400 ton  mine-laying cruiser, launched 1915
  (auxiliary): Auxiliary gunnery training ship, launched 29 May 1935, commissioned 8 February 1936, sunk 15 April 1940
  (minelayer): Minelayer, former Norwegian , captured 9 April 1940
 Brummer: training vessel; Wespe-class
 , Type 1934A destroyer, launched 1936
 Buéa: E-boat tender
 Bruno Kühn (822):  torpedo boat
 Bruno Kühn (823):  torpedo boat
 Bützow (244):  submarine chaser
 Bützow (244):  coastal protection vessel
 Buk: tug
 Bukarest: seaplane tender
 Burg:  minesweeper
  (cruiser): 1,650 ton  light cruiser, launched 1890
 Bussard: seaplane tender; Bussard-class
 Bussard:  submarine chaser
 :  (Type 141) fast attack craft, commissioned 1959 to 1975
 :  (Type 143) fast attack craft, decommissioned
 :  (Type 520) utility landing craft, used as transport ships (decommissioned)

C
 Calbe:  minesweeper
 : gunboat, launched 1860
 : armoured gunboat, launched 1878
 : 27,500 tonnes converted from ocean liner to troop ship, launched 1927, sunk 1945
 : , auxiliary cruiser, launched 1913, sunk 1914
 Capella: minesweeper; R-boat
 Capella: minesweeper; Schütze-class
 Carl F. Gauss: survey vessel; Kondor-II-class
 : fleet tender, launched 13 April 1939, commissioned 6 January 1940
 Carl Zeiss: training vessel, launched 1939
 : torpedo boat, launched 1886
 : corvette, launched 1880
 :R-boat, commissioned 1944—1962
 :  (Type 340) minesweeper, commissioned 1962—1990)
 : corvette, launched 1885
 Claus von Bevern: experimental craft, launched 1911
 Cobra: mine warfare vessel, launched 1926
 :  (Type 701) replenishment ship
 : 4,400 ton  light cruiser, launched 1909
 : 5,600 ton  light cruiser, launched 1916
 Colberg: guard ship
 : gunboat, launched 1860, commissioned 1861—1881
 : aviso, launched 1892
 Concordia: gun sloop, launched 1848
 : cruiser, launched 1892
 : light cruiser, launched 1892, scuttled 1914
 : auxiliary cruiser, scuttled 1917
 : 11,000 ton unique auxiliary merchant cruiser
 Cottbus:  minesweeper
 Cottbus (614):  landing craft
 : gunboat, launched 1860
 : armoured gunboat, launched 1879
 :  (Type 320) minesweeper, commissioned 1959 to 1976, upgraded to Type 331, recommissioned 1979 to 2000
 : gunboat, launched 1860
 : dock ship, launched 1916

D
 :  (Type 142) fast attack craft, commissioned 1962—1983
 :  (Type 143A) fast attack craft
 Dänholm: buoy tender, ex-Leitholm
 : gunboat, launched 1825
 : corvette, launched 1851
 : 3,300 ton  light cruiser, launched 1905
 Darss (E441):  supply ship
 Darsser Ort:  buoy tender
 Darsser Ort (D22):  buoy tender
 :  (Type 332) minehunter
 : gunboat, launched 1860
 Delphin (1906): artillery tender and training vessel
 Delphin (1918): artillery training vessel 
 :  (Type 520) utility landing craft, used as transport ships (decommissioned)
 Delphin (A47):  salvage tug
 Demmin (GS02):  minesweeper
 Deneb (1943), mine warfare vessel
 Deneb (1961), mine warfare vessel
 : 27,000 ton , launched 1913
 : corvette, launched 1848
 Dessau (331):  minesweeper
 :  (Type 321) minesweeper, commissioned 1960 to 1969
 Deutschland: frigate
 : 7,600 ton , launched 1872
 : 13,000 ton , launched 1904
 : Auxiliary minelayer
 : 21,000 ton ocean liner converted in hospital ship, launched 1923, sunk 1945
 : School ship
  (cruiser): 12,000 ton  heavy cruiser, launched 1931, renamed Lützow in 1939
 : Training cruiser
 , Type 1936 destroyer, launched 1937, scuttled 1940
 Dietrich von Bern, 
 :  (Type 332) minehunter
  (1937): supply ship
 Dithmarschen (1955): supply ship
 : mine warfare vessel, launched 1926, sunk 1943
 :  fast attack craft, commissioned 1961—1974
 :  (Type 148) fast attack craft, decommissioned
 Donau (1921), submarine tender
 :  (Type 401) tender
 :  (Type 404) replenishment ship
 Dornbusch: buoy tender
 :  (Type 520) utility landing craft, used as transport ships (decommissioned)
 : gunboat, launched 1865
 Drache (1908): artillery tender and training vessel
 Drache: mine-warfare ships
 : 3,700 ton  light cruiser, launched 1907
 : 5,600 ton  light cruiser, launched 1917
 Dresden:  minesweeper
 Dr. Richard Sorge (713):  missile boat
 :  (Type 320) minesweeper, commissioned 1959 to 1979, upgraded to Type 351, recommissioned 1989 to 2000
 Dwarsläufer: mine-warfare ships; Sesia-class

E
 : gunboat, launched 1887
 : , launched 6 June 1903, commissioned 15 August 1903, burned 26 October 1917
 Eberswalde:  landing craft
 Eberswalde/Finow (634):  landing craft
 Eckernförde (1843): frigate, later renamed Gefion
 Eduard Jungmann (1907): training craft
 Egerland (1939): supply ship
 Eidechse (1944): landing craft
 Eider: customs steamer
 :  (Type 139) trawler, former Royal Navy 
 Eifel: tanker; Klasse 766
 Eilenburg (344):  minesweeper
 :  (Type 721) icebreaker, decommissioned 1997
Eisbär: icebreaker, taken by the Soviet Union in 1946, decommissioned in 1979
 Eisenach:  minesweeper
 Eisenhüttenstadt:  landing craft
 Eisenhüttenstadt (615):  landing craft
 Eisleben:  minesweeper
 Eisleben (312):  minesweeper
 : Schnellboot fast attack craft, commissioned 1956—1967
 :  (Type 721) icebreaker
Eisvogel: icebreaker, taken by the Soviet Union in 1946, decommissioned in 1972
 : schooner, launched 1831
 Elbe: R-boat tender
 :  (Type 401) tender
 :  (Type 404) replenishment ship
 :  light cruiser, launched 1914
 : frigate, 1868
 Ellerbek: harbour tug; Neuende-class
 : 13,000 ton , launched 1903
 Elsaß (1930): mine warfare vessel
 :  (Type 140) fast attack craft, commissioned 1960—1974
 :  (Type 148) fast attack craft, decommissioned
 Elster:  submarine chaser
 : 3,700 ton  light cruiser, launched 1908
 :  light cruiser, launched 1916
  (cruiser): 6,000 ton unique light cruiser, launched 1925
 :  (Type 120) frigate, commissioned 1961 to 1983
 :  (Type 122) frigate
 Ems (1940): tender
 Emsland (1943): tanker
 :  (Type 352) minesweeper
 Erfurt:  minesweeper
 :  (Type 130) corvette, commissioned 2013
 : Type 1934A destroyer
 : Type 1934A destroyer
 Erich Kuttner (863):  torpedo boat
 : Type 1934A destroyer
 Ermland (1939): supply ship
 Ernst Grube (833):  torpedo boat
 Ernst Schneller (864):  torpedo boat
 Ernst Schneller(851):  torpedo boat
 Ernst Thälmann (141):  frigate
 Erwin Wassner (1938): submarine escort vessel
 Erzherzog Johann: corvette, launched 1840
 Esau (1941): fast attack craft
 Esper Ort (D28):  buoy tender
 ESSO Hamburg (1939): tanker
 Etkar André (822):  torpedo boat
 Etkar André (811):  torpedo boat
 Eutin (1943): tanker
 : , commissioned 1984

F
 : aviso, launched 1865
 : cruiser, launched 1891
 : torpedo boat; Raubvogel-class
 Falke: seaplane tender; Bussard-class
 Fasana: mine-warfare ships; Fasana-class
 Flink: torpedo boat; Schütze-class
 Föhr: harbour tug; Sylt-class
 :  (Type 141) fast attack craft, commissioned 1959 to 1975
 :  (Type 143) fast attack craft, decommissioned
 Falke:  submarine chaser
 :  (Type 720) tug
 :  (Type 520) utility landing craft, used as transport ships (decommissioned)
 Fiete Schulze (863):  torpedo boat
 Fiete Schulze (854):  torpedo boat
 Fische (1959): mine-sweeping vessel
 Flensburg: Schooner lightship, built 1910
 :  (Type 320) minesweeper, commissioned 1959 to 1970, upgraded to Type 331
 :  (Type 331, upgraded Type 320 Lindau-class) minesweepers, commissioned 1972 to 1991
 :  (Type 520) utility landing craft, used as transport ships (decommissioned)
 Förde (1967): support vessel
 Forst:  minesweeper
 :  (Type 520) utility landing craft, used as transport ships (decommissioned)
 Franken (1939): supply ship
 Frankenland (1950): tanker
 :  (Type 332) minehunter
 :  light cruiser, launched 1915
 Frankfurt: Frankfurt-class
 :  (Type 702) replenishment and combat support ship
 Frankfurt/Oder:  minesweeper
 Frankfurt/Oder (613):  landing craft
 : schooner, launched 1855
 : 2,700 ton  light cruiser
 :  light cruiser, cancelled 1919
 Frauenlob (1919): tender
 Frauenlob (1965): mine-sweeping vessel
 Freiberg:  minesweeper
 :  (Type 701) replenishment ship
 Freesendorf: buoy tender
 Freesendorf: buoy tender
 :  (Type 142) fast attack craft, commissioned 1963—1983
 :  (Type 143A) fast attack craft
 Freundschaft: cutter
 : corvette, launched 1874
 : 5,700 ton  protected cruiser, launched 1897
 Freya (1960): mine-sweeping vessel
 Freyr (1912): training vessel
 Friedrich Bremse (1936): supply ship
 : armoured frigate, launched 1867
 : 9,000 ton  armored cruiser, launched 1902
 : 6,800 ton , launched 1874
 : 25,000 ton , launched 1911
 : Type 1934A destroyer
 Friedrich Engels (123):  frigate
 : Type 1934A destroyer 
 : Type 202 submarine
 : experimental submarine
 Friesenland: seaplane tender
 : 3,700 ton , launched 1891
 Frithjof (1916): training vessel
 Fritz Behn (841):  torpedo boat
 Fritz Behn (851):  torpedo boat
 Fritz Gast (714):  missile boat
 Fritz Globis (573):  coastal protection vessel
 Fritz Heckert (866):  torpedo boat
 Fritz Heckert (834):  torpedo boat
 Fritz Lesch (865):  torpedo boat
 Fritz Riedel (825):  torpedo boat
 : gunboat, launched 1860
 Fuchs (1905): artillery tender and training vessel
 Fuchs (1919): anti-aircraft training vessel
 :  (Type 140) fast attack craft, commissioned 1959—1973
 :  (Type 148) fast attack craft, decommissioned
 : 10,700 ton unique armored cruiser, launched 1897
 : , laid down in 1915 but never completed
 Fürstenberg: training vessel
 :  (Type 320) minesweeper, commissioned 1960 to present, upgraded to Type 331, not decommissioned for upgrade
 :  (Type 332) minehunter

G
 Gadebusch (211):  submarine chaser 
  (211):  corvette
 : frigate, launched 1859
 : 2,700 ton  light cruiser, launched 1898
 Gazelle (1919): tender
 Gazelle (1963): mine-sweeper
 Gedania (1919): supply ship
 : frigate
 : 3,700 ton unique light cruiser, launched 1893
 Gefion (1963): mine-sweeper
 : 1,900 ton  cruiser, launched 1894
 : auxiliary cruiser
 :  (Type 141) fast attack craft, commissioned 1959 to 1975
 :  (Type 143) fast attack craft, decommissioned
 Gellen (D112):  buoy tender
 Gemma (1959): mine-sweeper
 Gentin (V812):  minesweeper
 : Type 1934 destroyer
 :  (Type 142) fast attack craft, commissioned 1963—1982
 :  (Type 143A) fast attack craft
 Gera:  minesweeper
 Germania (1848): gun sloop
 :  (Type 701) replenishment ship
 Glyndwr: seaplane tender
 : 3,000 ton , launched 1879
  (armored cruiser): 11,600 ton  armored cruiser, launched 1906
  (battleship): 35,000 ton , launched 1936
 : , former Royal Navy , commissioned 1958 to 1966
 : 23,000 ton , launched 1911
 Görlitz:  minesweeper
 :  (Type 320) minesweeper, commissioned 1958 to 1976, upgraded to Type 331
 :  (Type 331, upgraded Type 320 Lindau-class) minesweepers, commissioned 1979 to 1997
 Gollwitz (D25):  buoy tender
 : Sail training ship, launched 1933, became Soviet training ship Tovarishch
 : Type 441 unique sail training barque, launched 1958
 Gotha:  minesweeper
 Graal-Müritz (G424):  minesweeper
  (battlecruiser): , not completed
 : Type 138 frigate, commissioned 1959 to 1964
 Graf von Götzen: commissioned 1914
 : 28,000 ton , launched 1938 but never completed
 Granitz:  supply ship
 Gransee (313):  minesweeper
 Grasort (D27):  buoy tender
 :  light cruiser, launched 1913
 : cruiser, launched 1886
 : auxiliary cruiser
 Greif (1926): torpedo boat
 :  (Type 141) fast attack craft, commissioned 1959 to 1976
 :  (Type 143) fast attack craft, decommissioned
 Greif: air control ship
 Greifswald:  minesweeper
 Greifswald (V814):  minesweeper
 Greiz:  minesweeper
 Grevesmühlen (213):  submarine chaser 
  (212):  corvette
 : aviso, launched 1857
 Grille (1916): experimental craft
 : aviso, launched 1936
 Grimma (336):  minesweeper
 Grimmen:  landing craft
 Grimmen (616):  landing craft
 : 6,800 ton , launched 1875
 : 26,000 ton , launched 1913
 : corvette, launched 1848
 :  (Type 332) minehunter
 Güstrow:  minesweeper
  (223):  corvette
 Gunther Plüschow: air control ship
 Gustav Nachtigal (1940): S-boat tender

H
 : gunboat, launched 1860
 : gunboat, launched 1879
 :  (Type 141) fast attack craft, commissioned 1959 to 1976
 :  (Type 143) fast attack craft, decommissioned
 Habicht:  submarine chaser
 :  (Type 140) fast attack craft, commissioned 1960—1974
 :  (Type 148) fast attack craft, decommissioned
 : 3,700 ton , launched 1893
 Hagen (1921): training craft
 Hagenow:  minesweeper
 Hagenow (632):  landing craft
 Hai (1935): escort vessel
 : Type 240 submarine, former Kriegsmarine 
 Hai: Type M-9-463 salvage tug
 Halle:  minesweeper
 Halle (143):  frigate
 : corvette, launched 1841
  (cruiser): 3,300 ton  light cruiser, launched 1903
 :  (Type 101A) destroyer, decommissioned
 :  (Type 124) frigate
  (1959):  (Type 321) minesweeper, commissioned 1959 to 1963
 :  (Type 352) minesweeper
 Hanno Günther (845):  torpedo boat 
 : 13,000 ton , launched 1905
 Hans Albrecht Wedel: air control ship; K-VI-class
 Hans Beimler (862):  torpedo boat
 Hans Beimler (575):  corvette
 Hans Bürkner (1961): support vessel
 Hans Christian Oderstedt (1943): experimental craft
 Hans Coppi (863):  torpedo boat
 Hans Coppi (812):  torpedo boat
 : Type 1934A destroyer
 : Type 1936 destroyer
 Hans Rolshoven: air control ship
 : Type 202 submarine
 : frigate, launched 1847
 : armoured corvette, launched 1872
 : 5,700 ton  protected cruiser, launched 1898
  (auxiliary cruiser): 19,200 ton unique auxiliary merchant cruiser
 Hansa (1957): minesweeper
 : minelayer
 Harz (1953): tanker
 Harz: (H31):  supply ship
 Havel (1919): tender
 Havelland (H51):  supply ship
 : gunboat, launched 1860
 : gunboat, launched 1881
 Hay (1907): artillery tender and training vessel
 Hecht (1917): experimental craft
 : Type 240 submarine, former Kriegsmarine 
 : 3,700 ton , launched 1892
 Heimdall: training craft
 Heinrich Dorrenbach (711):  missile boat
 Heinz Kapelle (823):  torpedo boat
 Heinz Kapelle (811):  torpedo boat
 Heinz Roggenkamp (1952): experimental craft
 : schooner, launched 1853
 : 2,000 ton unique aviso, launched 1895
 Hela (1919): fleet tender
 Hela (1938): fleet tender
  (battleship): 23,000 ton , launched 1909
 :  (Type 720) tug, decommissioned 1997
 Heppens: harbour tug; Neuende-class
 Herbert Balzer (825):  torpedo boat
 Herbert Norkus (1939): sailing school ship
 Herkules (1960): minesweeper
 : Type 1936 destroyer
 : Type 1934A destroyer
 Hermann von Helmholtz (1943): experimental craft
 Hermann von Wissmann (1940): tender
 :  (Type 142) fast attack craft, commissioned 1962—1983
 :  (Type 143A) fast attack craft
 : captured Greek destroyer Vasilefs Georgios
 : submarine chaser, launched 1960 
 :  (Type 332) minehunter
 : frigate, launched 1864
 : 5,700 ton  protected cruiser, launched 1897
 Hertha (1961): minesweeper
  (battleship): 13,000 ton , launched 1903
 :  (Type 101A) destroyer, decommissioned
 :  (Type 124) frigate, commissioned 2006
 Hettstadt (315):  minesweeper
 Hiddensee: Project 35 tanker
 Hiddensee: corvette; Tarantul-I-class
 : 3,700 ton , possibly not completed
 Hildebrand (1921): training craft
 Hille (1917): minesweeper tender
 : 27,000 ton , launched 1915
 :  frigate, former Royal Navy , commissioned 1959 to 1964
 Hohenzollern (1876): imperial yacht
 Hohenzollern (1892): imperial yacht
 Hohenzollern (1914): imperial yacht
 Holnis (1965): minesweeper
 :  (Type 332) minehunter
 Horst Wessel: Sail training ship, launched 1936, became United States Coast Guard 
 Hoyerswerda:  landing craft
 Hoyerswerda (611):  landing craft
 Hugin (1917): training craft
 : Nasty class (Type 152) fast attack craft, commissioned 1960 to 1973
 Hugo Ecken (A114):  air control vessel
 Hugo Zeye' (1940): torpedo training vessel
 : armoured gunboat, launched 1881
 Hummel (1940): escort vessel
 : gunboat, launched 1860
 : gunboat, launched 1878
 :  (Type 142) fast attack craft, commissioned 1963—1984
 :  (Type 143A) fast attack craft
 Hydrograph: survey vessel

I
 Ida (1859): armed steam ship
 Ill (1928): supply ship
 Ilmenau:  minesweeper
 : gunboat
  (gunboat): , launched 4 August 1898, commissioned 1 December 1898 to 28 August 1914
 Iltis (1905): auxiliary cruiser
 Iltis (1927): torpedo boat 
 :  (Type 140) fast attack craft, commissioned 1957—1975
 :  (Type 148) fast attack craft, decommissioned
 Immelmann: air control ship; K V-class
 :  (Type 520) utility landing craft, used as transport ships (decommissioned)
 Irben (1935): mine-warfare vessel
 : 5,000 ton  protected cruiser, launched 1887
 Isar (1930): submarine tender
 :  (Type 402) tender

J
 Jade (1967): support ship
 : gunboat, launched 1860
 : torpedo gunboat
 : aviso, launched 1888
 Jagd (1919): tender
 Jagd (1935): escort vessel
  (gunboat): , launched 19 August 1898, commissioned 4 April 1899, scuttled 7 November 1914
 Jaguar (1928): torpedo boat
 :  (Type 140) fast attack craft, commissioned 1957 to 1973
 :  (Type 148) fast attack craft, decommissioned
 Jasmund (K41):  survey vessel
 Jena:  minesweeper
 Jeverland (1937): tanker
 Jeverland (1940): replenishment ship
 Joh. L. Krüger: Project RL 234 research vessel
 Johann Wittenborg: experimental craft; Minesweeper 1916
 Jordan: survey vessel
 Jordan: survey vessel
 Josef Römer:  torpedo boat
 Josef Schares (753):  missile boat
 Jüterbog (342):  minesweeper
 Juist (1968): diver training vessel
 :  (Type 722) tug
 Julius Adler:  torpedo boat
 Juminda (1894): mine warfare vessel
 Jungingen (1919): tender
 : harbour craft, launched 1874
 Jupiter (1944): minesweeper
 Jupiter (1961): minesweeper

K
 Kärnten (1914): supply ship
 Kaiser: Agamemnon-class
 : 7,600 ton , launched 1874
 : 25,000 ton , launched 1911
 Kaiser: mine-warfare ship
 : 11,600 ton , launched 1900
 : 11,600 ton , launched 1896
 : 11,600 ton , launched 1899
 : 11,600 ton , launched 1897
 : auxiliary cruiser
 : 11,600 ton , launched 1899
 : aviso
 : light cruiser, later renamed Seeadler : 25,000 ton , launched 1911
 : 6,000 ton unique heavy cruiser, launched 1892
 Kalkgrund II: Schooner lightship, built 1910
 Kalkgrund: experimental craft; Stollergrund-class
 Karl F. Gauss: survey vessel
 : Type 1936 destroyer
 Karl Kolls (1903): experimental craft
 Kamerun: Norwegian minesweeper  captured in April 1940, re-designated as Vorpostenboot, later to minelayer.
 Kamenz  minesweeper
 Kamenz (S321):  minesweeper
 Karl Liebknecht (123):  frigate
 Karl Marx (142):  frigate
 Karl Meseberg (733):  missile boat
 Karl-Marx-Stadt  minesweeper
 Karl Meyer: air control ship; K V-class
 :  light cruiser, launched 1912
 :  light cruiser, launched 1916
  (1927): 7,200 ton  light cruiser, launched 1927
 Karlsruhe (F223): Köln-class frigate
 :  (Type 122) frigate
 :  (Type 520) utility landing craft, used as transport ships (decommissioned)
 Kehrwieder: mine-warfare ships; Minesweeper 1916
 Kiebitz (1938): mine warfare vessel
 Kiel: paddle steamer
 Kirchdorf (G425):  minesweeper
 Klütz (G416):  minesweeper
 Knechtsand: harbour tug; Lütje Hörn-class
 Knechtsand: harbour tug; Nordstrand-class
 :  (Type 320) minesweeper, commissioned 1958 to 1975, upgraded to Type 331
 :  (Type 331, upgraded Type 320 Lindau-class) minesweepers, commissioned 1978 to 1999
  (cruiser): 7,200 ton  light cruiser, launched 1928
 :  (Type 120) frigate, commissioned 1961 to 1982
 :  (Type 122) frigate
 : 26,000 ton , launched 1913
 : 25,000 ton , launched 1912
 : unique armoured frigate, 9,700 tons, launched 1868; rebuilt 1897 into heavy cruiser
 : auxiliary mine warfare vessel
 Königin Luise (1934): mine warfare vessel
 Königin Luise (1935): escort vessel
 :  light cruiser, launched 1905
 :  light cruiser, launched 1915
  (1927): 7,200 ton  light cruiser, launched 1925
 Köthen  minesweeper
 : 4,400 ton  light cruiser, launched 1908
 Kollicker Ort (D116):  buoy tender
 Komet (1913): remote control craft
 : 7,500 ton unique auxiliary merchant cruise
 Komet  minesweeper
 Kondor (1926): torpedo boat
 :  (Type 141) fast attack craft, commissioned 1959 to 1976
 :  (Type 143) fast attack craft, decommissioned
 :  (Type 320) minesweeper, commissioned 1959 to 1980, upgraded to Type 351 and recommissioned 1989 to 2000
  (auxiliary cruiser): 19,000 ton unique auxiliary merchant cruiser
 :  (Type 141) fast attack craft, commissioned 1959 to 1976
 :  (Type 143) fast attack craft, decommissioned
 Kormoran (A68):  salvage tug
 Kormoran  submarine chaser
 :  (Type 140) fast attack craft, commissioned 1959 to 1973
 :  (Type 148) fast attack craft, decommissioned
 Kranich  submarine chaser
 :  (Type 340) minesweeper, commissioned 1959 to 1973
 Kreta: fighter control vessel
 Krischan der Große: anti-aircraft vessel
 Krischan II (from 1936 Gunther Plüschow): air control ship
 Krischan III (from 1936 Bernhard von Tschirschk): air control ship
 Krischan: air control ship
 Kriemhild (1939): Danube escort craft
 Krokodil: Eidechse-class landing craft
 Krokodill (1994): landing craft
 : Unique ironclad, commissioned September 1867
 : Original name for 1914 battleship 
  (auxiliary cruiser): 24,900 ton auxiliary cruiser, built as a civilian liner in 1901, commissioned as an auxiliary cruiser in 1914, surrendered to the US in 1915
 Kühlung (P441):  support ship
 Kühlungsborn (GS07):  minesweeper
 : torpedo boat
 :  (Type 332) minehunter
 : 10,500 ton , launched 1891
 Kyritz (321):  minesweeper

L
 :  (Type 332) minehunter, decommissioned 28 March 2012
 :  (Type 520) utility landing craft, used as transport ships
 :  (Type 403) tender
 Landtief (D115):  buoy tender
 Langeness: harbour tug; Lütje Hörn-class
 Langeness: harbour tug; Nordstrand-class
 :  (Type 722) tug
 Lauenburg: weather ship
 : Type 1934 destroyer
 Lech: submarine tender
 :  (Type 403) tender
 : , launched 1875
 : 3,300 ton  light cruiser, launched 1905
 : , launched 1918, not completed
  (1929): 8,000 ton , launched 1929
 Leipzig :  minesweeper
 Leitholm: buoy tender
 Leopard: auxiliary cruiser
 Leopard: torpedo boat; Raubtier-class
 Leopard: torpedo boat; Sleipner-class
 :  (Type 140) fast attack craft, commissioned 1958—1973
 :  (Type 148) fast attack craft, decommissioned
 Libben (V661):  torpedo recovery vessel
 :  (Type 320) minesweeper, commissioned 1958 to 1975, upgraded to Type 331
 :  (Type 331, upgraded Type 320 Lindau-class) minesweepers, commissioned 1978 to 2000
 Linz: mine-warfare ships
 Löwe: bewaffneter Raddampfer
 : aviso, launched 1859
 : gunboat, launched 1885
 Loreley: Stationsschiff
 Loreley: Minesweeper; Frauenlob-class
 Lothringen: Mine-warfare ships
 : 13,000 ton , launched 1904
 : Norwegian   captured on 9 April 1940, re-designated as torpedo boat.
 :  (Type 140) fast attack craft, commissioned 1959—1975
 :  (Type 148) fast attack craft, decommissioned
  (1899): Gunboat, launched 18 October 1899, commissioned 15 April 1900, blown up 28 August 1914
 Luchs: torpedo boat; Raubtier-class
 :  (Type 140) fast attack craft, commissioned 1958—1972
 :  (Type 148) fast attack craft, decommissioned
 Luckenwalde  minesweeper
 :  (Type 130) corvette, commissioned 2013
 Ludwigslust (247):  submarine chaser
 Ludwigslust (232):  corvette
 Lübben :  landing craft
 Lübben (631):  landing craft
 : corvette, launched 1844
  (cruiser): 3,300 ton  light cruiser, launched 1904
 :  (Type 120) frigate, commissioned 1963 to 1988
 :  (Type 122) frigate
 Lübz (246):  submarine chaser
 Lübz (221):  corvette
 :  (Type 701) replenishment ship
 Lütje Hörn: harbour tug; Lütje Hörn-class
 Lütje Hörn: harbour tug; Nordstrand-class
 :  (Type 103B) destroyer, decommissioned
  (battlecruiser): 27,000 ton , launched 1913
 : 14,000 ton modified  heavy cruiser, sold before completion to Soviet Union in 1939, never commissioned
 : 12,000 ton  heavy cruiser, renamed from Deutschland in 1939
 : corvette, launched 1872
 Lumme (923): Diving vessel

M
 : , launched 1917, not completed
  (cruiser):  light cruiser, launched 1911
 : , launched 1917
 Magdeburg,  minesweeper
 :  (Type 130) corvette, launched 2006, commissioned 2008
 :  (Type 401) tender
 :  (Type 404) replenishment ship
 : 4,400 ton  light cruiser, launched 1909
 :  (Type 520) utility landing craft, used as transport ships (decommissioned)
 Malchin (GS03):  minesweeper
 :  (Type 320) minesweeper, commissioned 1959 to 1976, upgraded to Type 331
 :  (Type 331, upgraded Type 320 Lindau-class) minesweepers, commissioned 1979 to 2000
 :  (Type 140) fast attack craft, commissioned 1959—1972
 :  (Type 148) fast attack craft, decommissioned
 : corvette, launched 1881
 : 26,000 ton , launched 1913
 :  (Type 340) minesweeper, commissioned 1961—1992)
 Max Reichpietsch (751):  missile boat
 Max Roscher (846):  torpedo boat
 : Type 1934 destroyer
 : 12,000 ton , launched 1901
 Mecklenburg, buoy tender
 :  (Type 123) frigate
 : corvette, launched 1864 
 : 2,700 ton  light cruiser
 :  (Type 701) replenishment ship 
 Meiningen,  minesweeper
 Meissen,  minesweeper
 : corvette, launched 1847
 : gunboat, launched 1865
 : aviso, launched 1890
 : gunboat, launched 1915
 Meteor,  survey vessel
 : 11,000 ton unique auxiliary merchant cruiser
 :  (Type 320) minesweeper, commissioned 1960 to 1975, upgraded to Type 331
 :  (Type 331, upgraded Type 320 Lindau-class) minesweepers, commissioned 1978 to 1997
 :  (Type 340) minesweeper, commissioned 1960—1973) is for sale click for details: – here
 :  (Type 103B) destroyer, decommissioned
 Mönchgut (E111):  supply ship
 Möwe,  submarine chaser
 : gunboat, launched 1879
 : auxiliary cruiser
 : 3,000 ton , launched 1877
 : 23,000 ton , launched 1910
 : 238 ton , launched 1872
 :  (Type 402) tender
 :  (Type 404) replenishment ship
 : Type 742 diver support ship
 : 3,300 ton  light cruiser, launched 1904
 : Nasty class (Type 152) fast attack craft, commissioned 1960 to 1964
 :  (Type 520) utility landing craft, used as transport ships (decommissioned)
 : brigg, launched 1851

N
 Najade: submarine chaser; Thetis-class
 : 19,000 ton , launched 1908
 : gunboat, launched 1860
 : armoured gunboat, launched 1880
 Natter: submarine chaser
 Natter: Otter-class
 Nauen:  minesweeper
 : gunboat, launched 1871
 : 2,000 ton , launched 1907
 Nautilus: experimental craft; minesweeper 1915
 Nautilus: minesweeper; Frauenlob-class
 :  (Type 401) tender
 Neiße: submarine tender
 Neptun: minesweeper; Schütze-class
 :  (Type 142) fast attack craft, commissioned 1963—1982
 :  (Type 143A) fast attack craft
 Nettelbeck: minesweeper
 Neubrandenburg:  minesweeper
 Neubrandenburg (633):  landing craft
 Neuende: harbour tug; Neuende-class
 Neuruppin (345):  minesweeper
 Neumark: Neumark-class
 Neuwerk: harbour tug; Sylt-class
 Neustrelitz (G412):  minesweeper
 Niedersachsen: mine-warfare ships
 :  (Type 122) frigate
 Nienburg: supply ship; Lüneburg-class
 : schooner, launched 1849
  (cruiser): 2,700 ton  light cruiser
 Niobe: Sail training ship, launched 1913
 Niobe: training vessel, Holland-class
 Niobe: experimental craft
 : aviso, launched 1850
 : corvette, launched 1885
 Nixe: minesweeper; Ariadne-class
 :  (Type 722) tug, decommissioned
 Nordperd (E171):  replenishment vessel
 Nordsee: tender
 Nordstern: tanker
 Nordstrand: harbour tug; Lütje-Hörn-class
 Nordstrand: harbour tug; Nordstrand-class
 Nordwind: sail training vessel; Kriegsfischkutter; border guard
 Notus: torpedo boat, tug
 Novara: frigate
 :  light cruiser, launched 1906
 :  light cruiser, launched 1916
  (cruiser): 8,000 ton , launched 1934, became Soviet 
 : corvette, launched 1863
  (cruiser): 2,700 ton  light cruiser
 Nymphe (coastal defense ship): Norwegian   captured in April 1940, re-designated as Flak ship.

O
 :  (Type 760) ammunition transport ship, decommissioned
 : 3,700 ton , launched 1894
 Odin: Odin-class
 Odin: minesweeper, Vorpostenboot; fish trawler
 :  (Type 701) replenishment ship
 :  (Type 423) fleet service, surveillance, and ELINT ship
 Oker: Oker-class
 : 5,250 ton unique coastal armored ship, launched 1884
 : 23,000 ton , launched 1910
 Oldenburg: mine-warfare ships; Sesia-class
 :  (Type 130) corvette, commissioned 2013
 : Training ship
 Oranienburg (341):  minesweeper
  (auxiliary cruiser): 15,000 ton unique auxiliary merchant cruiser
 Orion: R-boat
  (minesweeper):  (Type 340) minesweeper, commissioned 1962—1990
 Oste: tender, Faettenfjord-class
 :  (Type 423) fleet service, surveillance, and ELINT ship
 : 23,000 ton , launched 1909
 Ostmark: seaplane tender
 Ostmark: mine-warfare ships
 Ostseeland (II): representation yacht
 Ostseeland: representation yacht; Kondor-II-class
 Oswald: tender, Seaplane tender
 : gunboat, launched 1877
 : river gunboat, launched 1909
 Otter: mine-warfare ship; Irben-class
 Otter: Otter-class
 Otto Braun: experimental craft; Minesweeper 1916
 Otto Tost (731):  missile boat
 Otto von Guericke (A46):  salvage tug
 Otto Wünsche: submarine tender; Wilhelm-Bauer-class
 :  (Type 142) fast attack craft, commissioned 1963—1984
 :  (Type 143A) fast attack craft

P
 :  (Type 320) minesweeper, commissioned 1958 to 1979, upgraded to Type 351, recommissioned 1989 to 2000
 Palmer Ort (D39): 
  (gunboat): , launched 1 April 1901, commissioned 15 March 1903, sold 1931, scrapped
 Panther (destroyer), Norwegian   captured on 9 April 1940, re-designated as torpedo boat.
 :  (Type 140) fast attack craft, commissioned 1958—1973
 :  (Type 148) fast attack craft, decommissioned
 Parchim (215):  submarine chaser
 Parchim (242):  corvette
 Pasewalk (GS05):  minesweeper
 Passat: mine-warfare ships, supply ship
 Passat: harbour tug; Klasse 729
  (minesweeper):  (Type 321) minesweeper, commissioned 1960 to 1963
 :  (Type 332) minehunter
 Paul Eisenschneider (574):  corvette
 Paul Eisenschneider (713):  missile boat
 : Type 1934A destroyer
 Paul Schulz (752):  missile boat
 Paul Wieczorek (754):  missile boat
 Pegasus: minesweeper; R-boat
 Pegasus: minesweeper; Schütze-class
 :  (Type 352) minesweeper
 Pelikan: transport, mine-warfare ships, RM
 Pelikan: experimental craft; Minesweeper 1915
 :  (Type 140) fast attack craft, commissioned 1960—1974
 :  (Type 148) fast attack craft, decommissioned
 Pellworm: harbour tug; Klasse 729
 Perleberg (245):  submarine chaser
 Perleberg (243):  corvette
 Perseus: minesweeper; Schütze-class
 : 28,000 ton , never launched
 Pfälzerland: transport; Klasse 785
 : gunboat, launched 1860
 : aviso, launched 1882
 : Vosper (Type 153) fast attack craft, commissioned 1962—1965
 Phoenix: air control ship
 Piercer: customs cutter
 :  light cruiser, launched 1914
  (auxiliary cruiser): 17,600 ton unique auxiliary merchant cruiser
 :  (Type 140) fast attack craft, commissioned 1961—1973
 :  (Type 148) fast attack craft, decommissioned
 Pionier: sea cutter
 Planet: survey vessel; Planet-class
 Planet: research vessel
 Planet: research vessel
 Planet:  (Type 752), commissioned 2005
 Plön: harbour tug; Klasse 729
 :  (Type 520) utility landing craft, used as transport ships (decommissioned)
 Pluto: minesweeper; Schütze-class
 Poel: Project 35 tanker
 Pössneck:  minesweeper
 Pollux: minesweeper; Schütze-class
 :  (Type 340) minesweeper, commissioned 1961—1992)
 Pommern: mine-warfare ships
 Preußen: mine-warfare ships
 Preußen: mine-warfare ships
 : aviso, launched 1864
 : 13,000 ton , launched 1905
 : 19,000 ton , launched 1908
 Potsdam:  minesweeper
 Prenzlau: Project 2 training ship
 Prenzlau:  minesweeper
 Prenzlau (231):  corvette
 Prerow (G413):  minesweeper
 : 6,800 ton , launched 1873
 : 13,000 ton , launched 1903
 : aviso, launched 1846
 : Unique ironclad, originally ordered by the Confederate States Navy
 : corvette, launched 1876
 : 9,000 ton  armored cruiser, 1901
 : cruiser
 : 14,000 ton modified  heavy cruiser, launched 1938
 : 9,000 ton unique armored cruiser, 1900
 : cruiser, launched 1887
 : 25,000 ton , launched 1911
 Pritzwalk (325):  minesweeper
 :  (Type 142) fast attack craft, commissioned 1962—1981
 :  (Type 143A) fast attack craft
 Putlos: Todendorf-class

R
 Ranzow (D114):  buoy tender
 Rathenow (326):  minesweeper
 : Schnellboot fast attack craft, commissioned 1956—1967
 Raule: R-boat tender, minesweeper 
 :  frigate, former Royal Navy , commissioned through 1967
 :  light cruiser, launched 1914
 Regulus: minesweeper; Schütze-class
 :  (Type 340) minesweeper, commissioned 1962—1990)
 Reiher: launched 1909 as freighter, minesweeper, 1939-1945
 Reiher: launched 1938 as freighter & passenger liner, command ship, 1939-945
 Reiher:  submarine chaser
 :  (Type 140) fast attack craft, commissioned 1960—1973
 :  (Type 148) fast attack craft, decommissioned
 : Landing craft, decommissioned
 Rendsburg: armed trawler
 Renown: artillery training vessel
 Rerik (G426):  minesweeper
 Restaurador: gun boat
 Rhein: mine steamer; Rhein-class
 Rhein: mine transport; Irben-class
 : 238 ton , launched 1872
 :  (Type 401) tender
 :  (Type 404) replenishment ship
 : 19,000 ton , launched 1908
 :  (Type 122) frigate
 :  (Type 704) tanker
 Ribnitz-Damgarten (216):  submarine chaser
 Ribnitz-Damgarten (233): 
 : Type 1934 destroyer
 Richthofen: air control ship; K-VI-class
 Riems: Project 35 tanker
 Riesa (322):  minesweeper
 Rigel: minesweeper; R-boatder WM
 Rigel: minesweeper; Schütze-class
 Rival: torpedo boat, tug
 Robbe: Type M-9-463
 :  (Type 520) utility landing craft, used as transport ships (decommissioned)
 Röbel (324):  minesweeper
 Roland: mine-warfare ships
 :  (Type 103B) destroyer, decommissioned
 : 10,000 ton  armored cruiser, launched 1903
 Rosslau (V813):  minesweeper
 :  light cruiser, launched 1912
 : , launched 1918, not completed
 Rostock:  minesweeper
 Rostock (141):  frigate
 :  (Type 332) minehunter
 : brigg, launched 1853
 Ruden: Project RL 235 supply ship
 Rudi André (824):  torpedo boat
 Rudolf Breitscheid (842):  torpedo boat
 Rudolf Breitscheid (852):  torpedo boat
 Rudolf Diesel: experimental craft; YMS-class* Rudolf Eglhofer (572):  corvette
 Rudolf Eglhofer (751):  missile boat
 Rugard: R-boat tender
 :  (Type 401) tender

S
 : Großes Torpedoboot 1916 class, launched 1918
 : submarine tender
 :  (Type 402) tender
 :  (Type 701) replenishment ship
 : 7,800 ton , launched 1877
 : 29,000 ton , not completed
 :  (Type 124) frigate
 Sachsenwald: mine transport, Sachsenwald-class
 : aviso, launched 1850
 : gunboat, launched 1860
 : armoured gunboat, launched 1880
 Salamander: landing craft; Eidechse-class
 : Landing craft, decommissioned
 Santa Elena: seaplane tender
 Sassnitz (91):  missile boat
 Sassnitz:  minesweeper
 Saturn: minesweeper; R-boat
 Sauerland: transport; Klasse 785
 Schamien: river gunboat
 Scharf: torpedo boat; Schütze-class
 Scharhörn: harbour tug; Lütje-Hörn-class
 Scharhörn: harbour tug; Nordstrand-class
  (armored cruiser): 11,600 ton  armored cruiser, launched 1906
  (battleship): 35,000 ton , launched 1936
 :  frigate, former Royal Navy , commissioned 1959 to 1968
 : Type 138 frigate, commissioned 1959 to 1967
 :  (Type 520) utility landing craft, used as transport ships
 : 13,000 ton , launched 1906
 :  (Type 320) minesweeper, commissioned 1958 to 1979, upgraded to Type 351, recommissioned 1989 to 2000
  (battleship): 13,000 ton , launched 1906
 :  (Type 101A) destroyer, decommissioned
 :  (Type 123) frigate
 Schneewittchen: torpedo boat, station yacht
 Schönebeck (314):  minesweeper
 Schütze: torpedo boat; Schütze-class
 Schütze: minesweeper; Schütze-class
 : 12,000 ton , launched 1901
 Schwabenland: seaplane tender
 : gunboat, launched 1860
 : cruiser, launched 1887
 :  (Type 706) replenishment ship
 Schwedt:  landing craft
 Schwedt (636):  landing craft
 Schwerin: troop transport, mine-warfare ships
 Schwerin:  minesweeper
 Schwerin (612):  landing craft
 : gunboat, launched 1860
 : armoured gunboat, launched 1877
 Sedan: Leipzig-class corvette
  (cruiser): 1,650 ton  light cruiser, launched 1892
 Seeadler: torpedo boat; Raubvogel-class
 :  (Type 141) fast attack craft, commissioned 1958 to 1976
 :  (Type 143) fast attack craft, decommissioned
 Seehund: minesweeper; Seelöwe-class
 Seeigel: minesweeper; Seelöwe-class
 Seelöwe: minesweeper; Seelöwe-class
 Seepferd: minesweeper; Seelöwe-class
 Seeschlange: minesweeper; Seelöwe-class
 Seeschwalbe: fast attack craft; Silbermöwe-class
 Seestern: minesweeper; Seelöwe-class
 Senftenberg:  minesweeper
  (battlecruiser): 25,000 ton unique battlecruiser, launched 1912
  (cruiser): 14,000 ton modified  heavy cruiser, selected while under construction for conversion to an aircraft carrier, never completed
 :  (Type 352) minesweeper
 :  (Type 321) minesweeper, commissioned 1960 to 1963
 : 3,700 ton , launched 1889
 Sicher: torpedo boat; Schütze-class
 Sigfrid: minesweeper, Vorpostenboot; fish trawler
 : Schnellboot fast attack craft, commissioned 1956 to 1967
 : battleship, launched 1878
 Sirius: minesweeper; Schütze-class
 :  (Type 340) minesweeper, commissioned 1961 to 1990
 Skagerrak: mine-warfare ships
 Skorpion: Führer- und Wohnschiff für Vorpostenboote; erbeutete britische Personenfähre
 Skorpion: minesweeper; R-boat
 Skorpion: minesweeper; Schütze-class
 Sleipner: torpedo boat, RM
 Solidarität: sea cutter
 Sömmerda (311):  minesweeper
 Sonneberg:  minesweeper
 : corvette, launched 1881
 Sovetskaya Ukraina: Captured from the Soviet Union under construction, not completed
 : gunboat, launched 1860
 : cruiser, launched 1888
 Sperber: seaplane tender; Luftwaffe
 Sperber:  submarine chaser
 :  (Type 141) fast attack craft, commissioned 1959 to 1976
 :  (Type 143) fast attack craft, decommissioned
 :  (Type 704) tanker
 Spica: training vessel
 Spica: minesweeper; Schütze-class
 :  (Type 340) minesweeper, commissioned 1961 to 1992
 :  (Type 722) tug
 Steigerwald: mine transport, Sachsenwald-class
 : 3,000 ton , launched 1879
 Steinbock: minesweeper; Schütze-class
 Stendal:  minesweeper
 Sternberg:  minesweeper
 Sternberg (212:  submarine chaser
 :  light cruiser, launched 1907
 : 11,000 ton unique auxiliary merchant cruiser
 Stier: minesweeper, mine diving vessel Schütze-class
 :  (Type 520) utility landing craft, used as transport ships (decommissioned)
 Störtebeker: experimental craft; Minesweeper 1916
 Stollergrund: experimental craft; Stollergrund-class
 :  (Type 140) fast attack craft, commissioned 1960 to 1974
 :  (Type 148) fast attack craft, decommissioned
 : 3,000 ton , launched 1877
 : Vosper (Type 153) fast attack craft, commissioned 1962 to 1967
 : schooner, launched 1816
 :  light cruiser, launched 1911
 Strahl: experimental craft
 Stralsund: mine-warfare ships
 Stralsund:  minesweeper
 Stralsund (334):  minesweeper
 Strasburg (346):  minesweeper
 :  light cruiser, launched 1911
 Strelasund (V662):  torpedo recovery vessel
 Stubbenkammer: 
 : Schnellboot fast attack craft, commissioned 1956—1967
 :  light cruiser, launched 1906
 Südperd (E172):  replenishment vessel
 Suhl:  minesweeper
 :  (Type 332) minehunter
 Sylt: harbour tug; Sylt-class

T
 Taku: minesweeper 1916
 Tanga: E-boat tender
 Tangerhütte (333):  minesweeper
 Tannenberg: mine-warfare ships
 Tapfer: torpedo boat; Schütze-class
 Taucher I: K11 Project 24 diving vessel
 Taucher II: K47/K74: Project 24 diving vessel
 :  (Type 703) small coastal tanker
 Templin (GS06):  minesweeper
 Teterow (241:  submarine chaser
 Teterow (234):  corvette
 Thale: Project 17
 : Type 1934A destroyer
 : frigate, launched 1846
  (cruiser): 2,700 ton  light cruiser
 Thetis (Flak ship): Norwegian   captured in April 1940, re-designated as Flak ship.
 Theseus: submarine chaser; Thetis-class
 Thetis: submarine chaser; Thetis-class
 : 10,000 ton unique auxiliary merchant cruiser
 Thielbek: 2,800 ton Converted from freighter to transport ship, sunk 1945
 : river gunboat, launched 1826
 : 23,000 ton , launched 1909
 : gunboat, launched 1860
  (gunboat): , launched 15 August 1899, commissioned 3 April 1900, scuttled 29 October 1914
 Tiger: torpedo boat; Raubtier-class
 , Norwegian   captured in April 1940, re-designated as torpedo boat.
 :  (Type 140) fast attack craft, commissioned 1958 to 1974
 :  (Type 148) fast attack craft, decommissioned
 Timmendorf: supply ship
 : 42,000 ton , launched 1939
 Todendorf: Sicherungsboot; Todendorf-class; Wehrbereichskommando Küste
 , Norwegian minesweeper  captured in April 1940, re-designated as Vorpostenboot, later to minelayer
 Togo: nightfighter control ship
 Torgau:  minesweeper
 :  (Type 139 patrol trawler)
 Trave: Schul- und Begleitschiff, später Messboot; Eider-class
 Trischen: harbour tug; Lütje-Hörn-class
 : river gunboat, launched 1903
 Triton: survey vessel
 Triton: submarine chaser; Thetis-class
 Tsingtau: E-boat tender
 Tummler: cutter, training vessel
 :  (Type 320) minesweeper, commissioned 1958 to 1975, upgraded to Type 331
 :  (Type 331, upgraded Type 320 Lindau-class) minesweepers, commissioned 1978 to 1997
 :  (Type 520) utility landing craft, used as transport ships (decommissioned)

U
 Uckermark (H91): Ohre-class
 :  (Type 332) minehunter
 Ueckermünde (GS01):  minesweeper
 Ulan: torpedo testing ship, tender
 :  (Type 320) minesweeper, commissioned (1959 to 1978, upgraded to Type 351, recommissioned 1989 to 1999
 : brigg, launched 1869
 : 2,700 ton  light cruiser, launched 1902
 Undine: minesweeper; Frauenlob-class
 Uranus: minesweeper; Schütze-class
 Usedom:  tanker

V
 : river gunboat, launched 1903
 :  (Type 321) minesweeper, commissioned 1959 to 1963
 Versailles: mine-warfare ships
 : 5,700 ton  protected cruiser, launched 1897
 Victoria: corvette; Augusta-class
 Vilm: Project RL 235 tanker
 : frigate, launched 1863
 : 5,700 ton  protected cruiser, launched 1897
 Vineta: minesweeper; Ariadne-class
 : armoured gunboat, launched 1876
 Viper: landing craft; Eidechse-class
 Vitte (G421):  minesweeper
 Vogelsand: harbour tug; Lütje-Hörn-class
 Vogelsand: harbour tug; Nordstrand-class
 Vogtland (H71): Ohre-class
 :  (Type 320) minesweeper, commissioned 1960 to 1976, upgraded to Type 331
 :  (Type 331, upgraded Type 320 Lindau-class) minesweepers, commissioned 1979 to 1999
 Volker: minesweeper, Vorpostenboot; fish trawler
 Von der Groeben: R-boat tender; minesweeper 1916
 Von der Lippe: R-boat tender; minesweeper 1916
 : steam-powered gunboat, 1848 to 1862
  (battlescruiser): 19,400 ton unique battlecruiser, launched 1909
 Vulkan: submarine salvage vessel
 : river gunboat, launched 1899
 Vorwärts: torpedo boat; Schütze-class

W
 : gunboat
 : gunboat
 : auxiliary cruiser
 : auxiliary cruiser
 Wolf: torpedo boat; Raubtier-class
 Wolf: Buoy tender
 Wolja: russische Imperatriza Marija-class
 Wotan: Werkstattschiff; Odin-class, Bundesamt für Wehrtechnik und Beschaffung
 Wotan: minesweeper, Vorpostenboot; fish trawler
 Waage: minesweeper; Schütze-class
 : aviso, launched 1887
 Wacht: tender; Minesweeper 1916
 :  (Type 703) small coastal tanker, decommissioned
 Waldemar Kophamel: submarine tender; Wilhelm-Bauer-class
 Walfisch, ex-Borwin: tug
 Walter Husemann (856):  torpedo boat
 Walter Krämer (712):  missile boat
 Walther von Ledebur: experimental craft
 :  (Type 722) tug
 Waren:  minesweeper
 Waren (224):  corvette
 Wega: minesweeper; R-boat
 Wega: minesweeper; Schütze-class
 Weichsel: submarine tender
 :  (Type 332) minehunter, commissioned 1993 to 2006
 Weihe:  submarine chaser
 :  (Type 140) fast attack craft, commissioned 1959 to 1972
 :  (Type 148) fast attack craft, decommissioned
 :  (Type 320) minesweeper, commissioned 1959 to 1976, upgraded to Type 331 and recommissioned 1978 to 1995
 :  (Type 332) minehunter
 Weimar:  minesweeper
 : 10,500 ton , launched 1891
 Weisswasser:  minesweeper
 Welle: experimental craft
 :  (Type 520) utility landing craft, used as transport ships (decommissioned)
 Werdau:  submarine chaser
  (tender):  (Type 401) tender
 :  (Type 404) replenishment ship
 :  (Type 401) tender
 Weser: fishery protection vessel, minesweeper tender
 : gunboat, launched 1860
 : gunboat, launched 1876
 Wespe: training vessel; Wespe-class
 :  (Type 703) small coastal tanker, decommissioned
 :  (Type 760) ammunition transport ship
 : 19,000 ton , launched 1908
 Westfalen: seaplane tender
 : 12,000 ton , launched 1900
 :  (Type 320) minesweeper, commissioned 1958 to 1976, upgraded to Type 331
 :  (Type 331, upgraded Type 320 Lindau-class) minesweepers, commissioned 1978 to 1995
 : 16,000 ton unique auxiliary merchant cruiser
 Widder: minesweeper; Schütze-class
 :  light cruiser, launched 1915
 : , launched 1917, not completed
 :  (Type 142) fast attack craft, commissioned 1962—1984
 :  (Type 143A) fast attack craft
 : Schnellboot fast attack craft, commissioned 1957—1964
 : Type 241 submarine, former Kriegsmarine 
 Wilhelm Bauer: submarine tender Wilhelm-Bauer-class
 Wilhelm Florin (815):  torpedo boat
 : Type 1936 destroyer
 Wilhelm Leuschner (824):  torpedo boat
 Wilhelm Pieck (S61):  training ship
 Wilhem-Pieck-Stadt Guben (323):  minesweeper
 Willi Bänsch (844):  torpedo boat
 Willi Bänsch (831):  torpedo boat
 Wische: Ohre-class
 Wismar: Project 4
 Wismar (214:  submarine chaser
 Wismar (241):  corvette
 : 12,000 ton , launched 1900
 Wittensee: tanker; Klasse 763
 Wittow (E661):  supply ship
 Wittstock (315):  minesweeper
 : gunboat, launched 1860
 : gunboat, launched 1878
 :  (Type 140) fast attack craft, commissioned 1958—1975
 :  (Type 148) fast attack craft, decommissioned
 Wolfgang Thiess (866):  torpedo boat
 : Type 1934A destroyer
 :  (Type 320) minesweeper, commissioned 1958 to 1979, upgraded to Type 351, recommissioned 1989 to 2000
 Wolgast:  minesweeper
 Wolgast (V811):  minesweeper
 :  (Type 321) minesweeper, commissioned 1960 to 1963
 : 10,500 ton , launched 1892
 : 7,800 ton , launched 1878
 : 29,000 ton , not completed
 Wurzen:  minesweeper

Y
 : 10,000 ton  armored cruiser, launched 1904

Z
 : 12,000 ton , launched 1901
 Zander (A45):  salvage tug
 :  (Type 520) utility landing craft, used as transport ships (decommissioned)
 Zeitz:  minesweeper
 Zeitz (314):  minesweeper
 Zephir: torpedo boat, Tug
 Zerbst (335):  minesweeper
 Zick, Norwegian   captured in 1940, re-designated as Vorpostenboot.
 : aviso, launched 1876
 Zieten: tender, fishery protection vessel, minesweeper 
 Zingst (G444):  minesweeper
 :  (Type 142) fast attack craft, commissioned 1961—1982
 :  (Type 143A) fast attack craft
 Zwickau:  minesweeper

Unnamed

 : Schnellboot fast attack craft (former Kriegsmarine S116), commissioned 1957 to 1964
 : 1051 ton , launched 1914
 : 1051 ton Großes Torpedoboot 1913 class, launched 1914
 : 1051 ton Großes Torpedoboot 1913 class, launched 1915
 : 1051 ton Großes Torpedoboot 1913 class, launched 1915
 : 1051 ton Großes Torpedoboot 1913 class, launched 1915
 : 1051 ton Großes Torpedoboot 1913 class, launched 1915
 : 1051 ton Großes Torpedoboot 1913 class, launched 1915
 : Schnellboot fast attack craft (former Kriegsmarine S130), commissioned 1957 to 1993
 : Schnellboot fast attack craft (former Kriegsmarine S208), commissioned 1957 to 1964
 : 76-ton experimental submarine
 V108'':
 : , former United States Navy , commissioned 1959 to 1972
 : , former United States Navy , commissioned 1959 to 1981
 : , former United States Navy , commissioned 1959 to 1980
 : , former United States Navy , commissioned 1959 to 1981
 : , former United States Navy , commissioned 1960 to 1982
 : , former United States Navy , commissioned 1960 to 1967
  through : Type 1936A destroyers
  through : Type 1936A (Mob) destroyers
  through : Type 1936B destroyers
  through : Type 1936A (Mob) destroyers
  through : Type 1936B destroyers
 : German Type 1942 destroyer launched 1944

See also
 List of German Navy ship classes
List of ships of the Second World War

References

Hansen, Hans Jürgen, "Die Schiffe der deutschen Flotten 1848–1945" (Urbes, Gräfelfing vor München, 1974).
Gibbons, Tony, "The Complete Encyclopedia of Battleships" (Salamander Books, London, 1983).
Bundesamt für Wehrtechnik und Beschaffung, "Schiffsnummernverzeichnis für Schiffe, Boote und Betriebsfahrzeuge der Deutschen Marine und des Wehrtechnischen Bereichs", 2002

External links
 Deutsche Marine – Schiffsliste janmaat.de
 Kriegsmarine ships

 
Naval